USS LST-473 was a United States Navy  used in the Asiatic-Pacific Theater during World War II. As with many of her class, the ship was never named. Instead, she was referred to by her hull designation.

Construction
LST-473 was laid down on 10 July 1942, under Maritime Commission (MARCOM) contract, MC hull 993, by  Kaiser Shipyards, Vancouver, Washington; launched 9 December 1942; and commissioned on 16 March 1943.

Service history 
During World War II, LST-473 was assigned to the Asiatic-Pacific theater and participated in the following operations: the Lae occupation in September 1943; the Leyte operation in October 1944; the Lingayen Gulf landings in January 1945; the Zambales-Subic Bay operation in January 1945; and the Mindanao Island landings in March 1945.

LST-473 returned to the United States and was decommissioned on 18 March 1946. She was struck from the Navy list on 17 April, that same year. On 21 April 1948, the tank landing ship was sold to Hughes Bros., Inc., New York City, and subsequently scrapped.

Honors and awards
LST-473 earned five battle stars for her service in World War II.

See also 
 List of United States Navy LSTs
 List of United States Navy losses in World War II

Notes 

Citations

Bibliography 

Online resources

External links

 

1942 ships
Ships built in Vancouver, Washington
World War II amphibious warfare vessels of the United States
LST-1-class tank landing ships of the United States Navy
S3-M2-K2 ships